Nebria maritima is a species of ground beetle in the Nebriinae subfamily that is endemic to France.

References

maritima
Beetles described in 1976
Endemic beetles of Metropolitan France